Watching You may refer to:

 "Watching You" (Loose Ends song), 1988
 "Watching You" (Rodney Atkins song), 2006
 "Watching You" (Rogue Traders song), 2006
 Watching You, a 2020 EP by Robinson, or the title track

See also